Goodbye, Franklin High is a 1978 American film starring Lane Caudell, Julie Adams, Darby Hinton, Ann Dusenberry, and William Windom. The film's tagline is: It seems like it's taken forever – but at last we're on our own!

Plot
Will Armer (Caudell) is a high-school athlete, who during his senior year, must deal with his girlfriend (Dusenberry) and parents (Adams and Windom) and make a difficult decision between the certainty of college or the possibility of a glamorous baseball career. Everyone associated with Will has a different opinion, making the final decision all the more dramatic.

Cast
Lane Caudell as Will Armer
Julie Adams as Janice Armer
William Windom as Clifford Armer
Darby Hinton as Mark Jeffries
Ann Dusenberry as Sharon Browne
Ron Lombard as Gregg Lombardi
Stu Krieger as Kurt Moriarty
Myron Healey as Walter Craig
Virginia Gregg as Nurse

Release
The film was released theatrically in the United States by Cal-Am Artists in April 1978.

It was lauded by film critics upon its initial release, but prints no longer appear to be generally available, either on television or on video.

References

External links

1978 films
1978 independent films
American baseball films
American independent films
1970s English-language films
1970s American films